The 1971 Auburn Tigers football team represented Auburn University in the 1971 NCAA University Division football season. The Tigers offense scored 335 points while the defense allowed 182 points. SEC Champion Alabama handed Auburn their only conference loss of the year. Pat Sullivan won the Heisman Trophy.

Season
In the Iron Bowl, both teams entered the regular season finale undefeated: Auburn lost to Alabama, 31–7. On New Year's Day, the Tigers lost to Oklahoma in the Sugar Bowl, 40-22.

Schedule

Roster

1972 NFL Draft

Awards and honors
Pat Sullivan, Heisman Trophy
Pat Sullivan, Walter Camp Award

References

Auburn
Auburn Tigers football seasons
Auburn Tigers football